The Guided by Voices discography includes dozens of releases, both official and unofficial.  Robert Pollard, the main creative force behind the band, is an extremely prolific songwriter, having written or co-written more than 1,600 songs, with over 500 of them released under the Guided by Voices moniker.

In addition to official Guided by Voices albums, there have been numerous official singles, extended plays, split releases and compilations, as well as four box-sets of previously unreleased material known as "Suitcases" that each contain four CDs with twenty-five tracks each, for a total of 100 songs per release.

Studio albums

Extended plays

Split EPs

Singles

Split singles

Live albums

Box sets

Compilation albums 
Each of the four Briefcase releases is a single LP compilation of songs selected from the associated 4-disc Suitcase box-set.

Soundtracks

Video albums

Unofficial albums

Books 
 Guided by Voices: A Brief History — Twenty-One Years of Hunting Accidents in The Forests of Rock and Roll
Written by James Greer and published by Grove/Atlantic in 2005, this is the first biography of GBV authorized by the band. Steven Soderbergh wrote the foreword. Author Jim Greer, a former editor of Spin magazine, was also a member of the band from 1994 to 1996 (he wrote the song "Trendspotter Acrobat" on Sunfish Holy Breakfast).

 Bee Thousand
Written by Marc Woodworth and published by Continuum Books in 2006 as part of their 33⅓ series, this book is about the 1994 album Bee Thousand. The book explores the unusual production of the album, the lyrics of Robert Pollard, and the influence the album has had.

 Closer You Are: The Story of Robert Pollard and Guided By Voices
Written by Matthew Cutter.

References

External links 
 Official Guided by Voices website
 GBVDB – Guided by Voices Database

Discographies of American artists
Rock music group discographies